Janet Seidel (28 May 1955 – 7 August 2017) was an Australian jazz vocalist and pianist.

Education 
Seidel studied at the Elder Conservatorium at the University of Adelaide (BMusic, 1973–1976).

Career 
She worked as a high school music teacher in New South Wales  at the Sydney Girls High School and as a professional musician as a pianist and singer. From 1976 to 1980, she was an active member of the Adelaide Feminist Theatre Group. For their first show, The Carolina Chisel Show (1976), she wrote the piano arrangements. For the musical melodrama The Redheads' Revenge (1978), she wrote and arranged all the songs, conducted and played in the orchestra and was also involved in the writing, production and direction of the show. For the revue Out of the Frying Pan (1980), she wrote five original songs, collaborated with Judy Szekeres on the musical arrangement, played in the orchestra and was involved with the choreography.

Seidel's 18 CD albums, recorded with musicians including her brother, bassist David Seidel, have been nominated for prizes such as the ARIA Music Awards. Her album Moon of Manakoora won the Bell Award for Best Australian Jazz Vocal Album in 2006.

Death 
Seidel died on 7 August 2017 from ovarian cancer in Sydney at the age of 62. Some newspapers mistakenly reported her death as 8 August.
A posthumous CD of previously unreleased recordings was released in September 2018 in Japan. Entitled You Are There, it was produced by David Seidel.

Discography

Albums

Compilation albums

Awards and nominations

ARIA Music Awards
The ARIA Music Awards is an annual awards ceremony that recognises excellence, innovation, and achievement across all genres of Australian music. They commenced in 1987. 

! 
|-
| 1999
| The Way You Wear Your Hat
|rowspan="2"| Best Jazz Album
| 
|rowspan="2"| 
|-
| 2000
| Art Of Lounge Volume Two
| 
|-
| 2001
| Doris and Me
| Best Original Cast or Show Album
| 
| 
|-

References

1955 births
2017 deaths
Australian jazz singers
Australian jazz pianists
Australian women pianists
American women singers
Deaths from ovarian cancer
Deaths from cancer in New South Wales
People educated at Sydney Girls High School
21st-century American women

es:Janet Seidel#top